The Disturbed Wedding Night is a 1950 West German comedy film directed by Helmut Weiss and starring Curd Jürgens, Ilse Werner, and Susanne von Almassy. It is based on the 1944 British play Is Your Honeymoon Really Necessary? by Vivian Tidmarsh.

The film's sets were designed by the art directors Fritz Lück and Hans Sohnle.

Synopsis
A couple's honeymoon is interrupted by the sudden arrival of the husband's first wife.

Cast

See also
Is Your Honeymoon Really Necessary? (1953)

References

Bibliography

External links 
 

1950 films
1950 comedy films
German comedy films
West German films
1950s German-language films
Films directed by Helmut Weiss
German films based on plays
Comedy of remarriage films
German black-and-white films
1950s German films